Luka Grubišić (born 9 November 1997) is a Croatian footballer playing for Uskok.

Club career 
Coming from the Brda quarter of Split, Grubišić first joined the NK Dalmatinac Split academy at the age of 7, before moving on to HNK Hajduk Split 3 years later. In 2009, he moved on to the RNK Split academy, where he spent the rest of his youth career. A youth international, he debuted for the senior team in September 2014, at the age of 16.

In June 2017, after he featured in 29 league matches over the previous three seasons, Grubišić left the relegated RNK Split and joined NK Široki Brijeg.

Not getting enough playing time, he left Široki and moved to the Croatian third-tier NK Primorac 1929 club in February 2018. In February 2019, he then joined NK Dugopolje. In summer 2021, he left Hajduk Split II for Uskok.

References

External links

1997 births
Living people
Footballers from Split, Croatia
Association football midfielders
Croatian footballers
Croatia youth international footballers
RNK Split players
NK Široki Brijeg players
NK Primorac 1929 players
NK Dugopolje players
HNK Hajduk Split II players
NK Uskok players
Croatian Football League players
Premier League of Bosnia and Herzegovina players
First Football League (Croatia) players
Croatian expatriate footballers
Expatriate footballers in Bosnia and Herzegovina
Croatian expatriate sportspeople in Bosnia and Herzegovina